Oleg Perepetchenov (born September 6, 1975) is a Russian powerlifter and former weightlifter.

In the 2001 and 2002 World Weightlifting Championships, Perepetchenov won the silver medal in the Men's 77 kg weight category.  Perepetchenov competed in the Men's 77 kg at the 2004 Summer Olympics and won the bronze medal, lifting 365.0 kg in total.  At the 2001 and 2008 at the European Weightlifting Championships he won gold in the Men's 77 kg.  He was world champion in the 77 kg in clean and jerk at the 2006 World Weightlifting Championships.  At the 2008 Summer Olympics he ranked 5th in the 77 kg category, with a total of 354 kg.

On February 12, 2013 the International Olympic Committee stripped Perepetchenov of his 2004 Olympic medal after both probes were retested and showed traces of anabolic steroids.

Career bests

Weightlifting 
 Snatch: 175 kg in the class to 85 kg
 Clean and jerk: 210 kg in the class to 77 kg
 Total: 380 kg (175+205) 2005 World Championship in the class to 85 kg

Powerlifting 
 Squat: 320 kg in the class to 98 kg
 Bench Press: 290 kg in the class to 100 kg
 Deadlift: 290 kg in the class to 98 kg
 Total: 800 kg in the class to 98 kg

Notes and references 

1975 births
Russian male weightlifters
Living people
Weightlifters at the 2004 Summer Olympics
Weightlifters at the 2008 Summer Olympics
Olympic weightlifters of Russia
World record holders in Olympic weightlifting
Doping cases in weightlifting
Russian sportspeople in doping cases
Competitors stripped of Summer Olympics medals
European Weightlifting Championships medalists
World Weightlifting Championships medalists
21st-century Russian people